The 2006 UCI Road World Championships – Men's Under-23 Road Race took place on September 23, 2006, around the Austrian city of Salzburg. The race was won by German sprinter Gerald Ciolek, who took the sprint from Romain Feillu and Alexander Khatuntsev.

Results

References

Men's Under-23 Road Race
UCI Road World Championships – Men's under-23 road race